Guy William Glodis (born February 15, 1969 in Worcester, Massachusetts) is an American politician who served as Sheriff of Worcester County, Massachusetts from 2005 to 2011. Prior to becoming Sheriff, Glodis served in the Massachusetts Senate and the Massachusetts House of Representatives.

He was an unsuccessful candidate for Massachusetts State Auditor in 2010.

He is the son of former State Representative William Glodis.

References

1969 births
University of Massachusetts Amherst alumni
Democratic Party Massachusetts state senators
Democratic Party members of the Massachusetts House of Representatives
People from Auburn, Massachusetts
Sheriffs of Worcester County, Massachusetts
Living people